The Port of Bayóvar is located in the north of Peru.  It has a capacity for ships - tanks of 16 thousand 500 to 250 thousand TM.  The port has shelter in the form of a large bay.

Transport 

In 2009, it was proposed to build a railway for mineral traffic to this port by 2019. Also to Paita port. 

Another plan proposes the construction of a railway over the Andes via Pucallpa to Cruzeiro do Sul in Brazil.

References 

Bayovar